Cory Lamont Fleming (born March 19, 1971) is a former professional American football wide receiver in the National Football League (NFL) for the Dallas Cowboys. He also was a member of the Nashville Kats, Carolina Cobras and Orlando Predators in the Arena Football League. He played college football for the University of Tennessee.

Early years
Fleming attended Stratford High School, where he was the starting quarterback. As a senior, he passed for 860 yards and 6 touchdowns, while rushing for 400 yards and 11 touchdowns. He received All-state honors at the end of the season.

He was the starting power forward in basketball, earning honorable-mention All-state honors as a junior, when he led the state in rebounding with better than 15 boards per contest. He also practiced the high jump (6-10 1/2) in  track.

College career
Fleming accepted a football scholarship from the University of Tennessee and was converted to wide receiver. As a sophomore, he scored five touchdowns out of just 14 receptions, contributing to the team winning the SEC championship. After being the backup to Carl Pickens, he became a starter as a junior, registering 40 receptions for 490 yards (leading the team) and two touchdowns. In his last year, he posted 39 receptions for 596 yards and 11 touchdowns.

Fleming finished his college career with 94 receptions for 1,266 yards, and at the time school records, with 18 touchdown receptions, 11 single-season touchdown receptions, and six consecutive games with a touchdown reception.

Professional career

San Francisco 49ers
Fleming was selected by the San Francisco 49ers in the third round (87th overall) of the 1994 NFL Draft. On July 21, the team rescinded his rights because of salary cap reasons, making him a free agent without ever signing a contract or attending a practice.

Dallas Cowboys
On August 3, 1994, he was signed by the Dallas Cowboys. He was declared inactive in 11 games.

The next year, he competed to replace Alvin Harper in the starting lineup, but lost out to Kevin Williams and was named the team's third wide receiver, making him a part of the Super Bowl XXX winning team.

On February 6, 1996, he was suspended for a year by the NFL after failing a third drug test and was also waived by the Cowboys.

Arena Football League
In 1997, he was signed by the Nashville Kats of the Arena Football League, after being contacted by then offensive coordinator Jay Gruden. In 10 seasons, he was a five-time All-Arena, a four-time All–Ironman and an Ironman of the Year  selection.

In 2013, Fleming was inducted into the Arena Football Hall of Fame.

Personal life
Fleming owns an insurance agency and also organizes football camps for kids in the offseason. In August 2013, he was arrested in Davidson County, Tennessee, for driving under the influence of alcohol.

References

1971 births
Living people
Players of American football from Nashville, Tennessee
American football wide receivers
Tennessee Volunteers football players
Dallas Cowboys players
Nashville Kats players
Carolina Cobras players
Orlando Predators players